"Probablemente" (English: Probably) is a song composed and performed by Mexican singer Christian Nodal featuring vocals from Spanish singer David Bisbal. The song was released on June 9, 2017, as the third single from his debut album, Me Dejé Llevar.

"Probablemente" reached number two on the Top 20 General Mexican Songs Chart and number twenty on the Billboard Top Latin Songs chart in the United States.

Promotion
To promote the release of the song and his album Me Dejé Llevar, Nodal sang "Adiós Amor" and "Probablemente" at the 6th Your World Awards.

Chart performance
In Mexico, "Probablemente" reached number two on the Mexico Top 20 General chart. In the United States, the single entered Billboards Hot Latin Songs and peaked at number 31, while the song peaked at number 12 on Billboard's Regional Mexican Songs in 2017.

Charts

Year-end charts

Certifications

Release history

Solo version

References

2017 singles
Mexican folk songs
Spanish-language songs
Ranchera songs
Universal Music Latin Entertainment singles
Christian Nodal songs
2017 songs
David Bisbal songs
Latin Grammy Award for Best Regional Mexican Song
Songs written by Christian Nodal